The Mexican men's national under 20 ice hockey team is the national under-20 ice hockey team in Mexico. The team represents Mexico at the International Ice Hockey Federation's IIHF World U20 Championship.

International competitions

World Junior Championships

References

Ice hockey teams in Mexico
Junior national ice hockey teams
Ice hockey